Amata kinensis  is a species of moth of the family Erebidae first described by George Hampson in 1898. It is found on Borneo.

References 

kinensis
Moths described in 1898
Moths of Borneo